Pooparika Varugirom is a 1999 Indian Tamil-language film directed by A. Venkatesh. The film stars Sivaji Ganesan, Ajay and Malavika, whilst Raghuvaran and M. N. Nambiar play supporting roles. The film opened in September 1999 to negative reviews and did poorly at the box office. Despite failure in box office, it got remade in Telugu as Pelli Sambandham. This was Sivaji Ganesan’s last film.

Plot 
Aravind and Priya are cross-cousins and they fall in love. Their grandfathers Narayanan and Annan (Narayanan's elder brother played by Sivaji) are also keen about getting them married. However, Aravind is good-for-nothing in the eyes of Ambika, Priya's mother who is married to Narayanan's son Malaysia Vasudevan. To make this marriage happen, Annan and Narayanan starts to play a game where they both act as if they are on the opposite side when it comes to marriage with one of them opposing it while other supporting it while showing that Aravind is a good and capable person to Ambika in the process. Do they succeed?

Cast 
Sivaji Ganesan as the author of Pooparika Varugirom
Ajay as Aravind
Malavika as Priya
Raghuvaran as Ranganathan
Kavitha as Aravind's mother
M. N. Nambiar as Narayanan
Chinni Jayanth as Dhandapani
Malaysia Vasudevan
Ambika
Sanjeev as Vasanth

Soundtrack 
Lyrics were written by Vaasan.
 "Ailey Ailey" – Vidyasagar, Sujatha
 "Ananjalum" – Vidyasagar
 "Ettil Azhagu" – Srinivas
 "Kannum Kannum" – Sujatha, Srinivas
 "Kukkoo" – Gopal Rao, Malaysia Vasudevan
 "Thikki Thavikkiren" – Murali, Harini

References 

1999 films
Tamil films remade in other languages
1990s Tamil-language films
Films scored by Vidyasagar
Films directed by A. Venkatesh (director)